Meghe Dhaka Tara ( Mēghē Ḍhākā Tārā, lit. The Cloud-Capped Star) is a 1960 film written and directed by Ritwik Ghatak, based on a social novel by Shaktipada Rajguru with the same title. It stars Supriya Choudhury, Anil Chatterjee, Gita Dey, Bijon Bhattacharya, Niranjan Roy, and Gyanesh Mukherjee. It was part of a trilogy consisting of Meghe Dhaka Tara (1960), Komal Gandhar (1961), and Subarnarekha (1962), all dealing with the aftermath of the Partition of Bengal during the Partition of India in 1947 and the refugees coping with it.

Plot outline
The film revolves around Nita (played by Supriya Choudhury), a young girl who lives with her family, refugees from East Pakistan, in the suburbs of Calcutta. Nita is a self-sacrificing person who is constantly exploited by everyone around her, even her own family, who take her goodness for granted. Her father has an accident and is unable to make a living. Her elder brother Shankar (played by Anil Chatterjee) believes that his craft (singing) needs to be perfected before he can make any income from it and therefore the burden of taking care of the family falls on Nita. Her life is ridden with personal tragedy: her lover Sanat leaves her for her sister Geeta, her younger brother is injured while working in a factory and finally she herself becomes a burden for her family by contracting tuberculosis. Her mostly absent would-be singer brother is the only person who cares about her in the end. At the end of the film, she screams out her agony, throwing herself into her brother's arms. She utters her last words: "Brother, I want to survive (দাদা, আমি বাঁচতে চাই।)."

Cast

Production
This film was directed by independent filmmaker Ritwik Ghatak in Kolkata (then Calcutta). In contrast to many Bollywood films made in Mumbai, India's main film center, Ghatak's films are formally elaborate and somber, and often address issues related to the Partition of India. Although Partition is never explicitly mentioned in Meghe Dhaka Tara, the film takes place in a refugee camp in the outskirts of Calcutta, and concerns an impoverished genteel Hindu bhadralok family and the problems they face because of Partition.

The film is perhaps the most widely viewed film among Ghatak's works; it was his greatest commercial success at home, and coincided with an international film movement towards personal stories and innovative techniques (the so-called 'new wave'). After Ghatak's death, his work (and this film in particular) began to attract a more sizable global audience, via film festivals and the subsequent release of DVDs both in India and in Europe.

Meghe Dhaka Tara is strongly melodramatic in tone, especially as concerns the sufferings heaped on the protagonist. As in many of his other films, Ghatak also uses surrealistic sound effects, such as sounds of a lashing as the heroine suffers yet another tragic twist of fate.

Music 
Jyotirindra Moitra composed the film score. He used classical Indian musical forms and included a song by Rabindranath Tagore, sung to Nita by her brother, Shankar. Moitra also wrote the film music for Ritwik Ghatak's Komalgandhar.

Credits
Story: Shaktipada Rajguru
Screenplay:  Ritwik Ghatak
Cinematography: Dinen Gupta
Assistant: Soumendu Ray, Sunil Chakraborty, Sukhendu Dasgupta, Krishnadhan Chakraborty, Shankar Guha, Mahendra Kumar, Agnu
Editing: Ramesh Joshi
Assistant: Gobinda Chattopadhay, Punu Sen
Sound: Satyen Chatterjee
Art Direction: Rabi Chatterjee
Music: Music Director:Jyotirindra Moitra  Assistant(s): Ustad Bahadur Khan
Production: Chitrakalpa

Reception

Ghatak on the film 
The title 'Meghe Dhaka Tara' was given by me, original story was published in a popular newspaper by the name of 'Chenamukh'. Something in this story stirred me. And that is why Shakespeare's 'The Cloud Capped Star' struck my mind and I decided to pen a new script all together. It could be a bit sentimental, but to throw overtones out of it came to mind gradually. Here I made use of Indian mythology which is a part of my life. 'Meghe Dhaka Tara' expressed my thoughts.

Screening of Meghe Dhaka Tara in different festivals

1968: Ritwik Film Festival by Calcutta Cine Institute
1968: Ritwik Film Festival by Jadavpur University
1974: Ritwik Film Festival by Bengali club of Delhi
1976: Ritwik Ghatak Retrospective at Society Theatre by Federation of Film Society
1978: International Film Festival, Madras (Chennai)
1982: Ritwik Film Festival by London film and Theatre Festival
1983: Ritwik Film Festival, France
1985: Ritwik Ghatak Retrospective at India International Centre, Delhi
1985: 25 anniversary by Ritwik Memorial Trust at the Nandan
1985: Festival of India Celebration, USA
1986: Major Retospective of Indian Cinema, Lisbon
1987: Film section of Festival of India, Switzerland
1987: Festival of India in Japan
1987: Celebrating Ghatak's birthday at Nandan celebration
1987: Ritwik Festival by the Bombay Screen Unit
1988: Ritwik Festival at Gorky Sadan jointly organised by Ritwik Memorial Trust and Eisenstein Cine Club, Calcutta
1990: Ritwik Retrospective at Rotterdam Film Festival, Netherlands
1990: Ritwik Retrspective organised by Chennai Film Society, Madras
1990: Locarno Film Festival, Switzerland
1991: Ritwik Film Festival, Zurich
1992: Film Festival titled 'Amader Bhalobasar Ritwik' at Ganabhaban, organised by Uttarapara Cine Club
1997: New York film festival
1998: Part of 'Classic Film Classic Directors' category', Calcutta International Film Festival
1999: Best Masterpiece Film, Pusan Film Festival
1999: Barcelona, Madrid
2012: Toronto International Film Festival, Canada
2012: Kolar Hills Film Festival, Bangalore (Bettadalli Ghatak: A Festival of Ritwik Ghatak's Films)
2012: 10th Pune International Film Festival, Pune
2017: Ritwik Ghatak Retrospective UK, at Dundee Contemporary Arts, Dundee, Scotland, UK, Programme curated by Sanghita Sen, Department of Film Studies, St Andrews University, UK

Legacy

Accolades 
In 2012, Meghe Dhaka Tara was ranked at #235 and #322 on the Sight & Sound's critics' and directors' poll of "The Greatest Films of All Time" respectively. The movie is also listed in the book 1001 Movies You Must See Before You Die, which praises "the grace of Ghatak's mise en scène, his expressionist sound design, and the enormous sense of loss."

Releases

The Criterion Collection 
The Criterion Collection released the latest and definitive restoration of the film on Blu-ray, DVD, and on their streaming platform the Criterion Channel in 2019.

Adaptations 
In 2016, Bratya Basu made a Bengali drama based on the plot of this film. The drama was first staged on 2 January 2016 at University Institute Hall at Kolkata.

See also
 List of works of Ritwik Ghatak
Dhaka University Film Society

References

External links 

The Cloud-Capped Star: A Cry for Life an essay by Ira Bhaskar at the Criterion Collection

1960 films
Bengali-language Indian films
Films directed by Ritwik Ghatak
Films set in the partition of India
Partition of India in fiction
Films about poverty in India
1960s Bengali-language films
Films based on works by Shaktipada Rajguru